The Traffic Tunnel Administration Building, also known as Boston Police Station Number One, is a historic government building in the North End of Boston, Massachusetts.  The building occupies a prominent position facing North End Park off the Rose Kennedy Greenway, and is bounded by the park, North Street, and the trench carrying the exit point of the Sumner Tunnel.  The Georgian Revival building was designed by Salem architect John M. Gray and built in 1931.  The southern facade, facing the park, was originally used as the administrative facilities for Boston's tunnels, and the eastern facade provided access to the police station.  The administration facilities are now used by the local police union, and the police station now houses the North Bennet Street School.

The building was listed on the National Register of Historic Places in 2015.

See also
National Register of Historic Places listings in northern Boston, Massachusetts

References

External links

2014 Nomination of building to NRHP

Government buildings on the National Register of Historic Places in Massachusetts
National Register of Historic Places in Boston
North End, Boston
Government buildings in Boston
1931 establishments in Massachusetts